Aslewa  is a village development committee (VDC) in Gulmi District in the Lumbini Zone of central Nepal. At the time of the 1991 Nepal census it had a population of 8088 persons living in 992 individual households. The village has a temple called Rudra Beni Dhaam and a school for higher level study, the Shree Janata Higher Secondary School.

References

External links
UN map of the municipalities of Gulmi District

Populated places in Gulmi District